Norman Woods (born 19 August 1936) is a New Zealand former cricketer. He played eighteen first-class matches for Otago between 1958 and 1966.

See also
 List of Otago representative cricketers

References

External links
 

1936 births
Living people
New Zealand cricketers
Otago cricketers
Cricketers from Dunedin